Roy Walter Alward (September 20, 1877 – June 19, 1959) was a Canadian politician. He served in the Legislative Assembly of British Columbia from 1931 to 1933 from the electoral district of Fort George, a member of the Conservative party.

References

1877 births
1959 deaths